Greatest Hits is the first greatest hits album  from American country music singer Martina McBride, issued by RCA Nashville in 2001. In addition to chronicling the greatest hits of her career at the time, it includes four new songs, all of which were released as singles. The compilation reached number 1 on Top Country Albums and received a Quadruple-platinum certification from the Recording Industry Association of America (RIAA) on December 12, 2018.

Content
McBride's greatest hits are presented in chronological order on the album, starting with "My Baby Loves Me" from 1992 and ending with "There You Are" from 2000. Besides these tracks, the disc includes "Strangers", a track cut from 1993's The Way That I Am which McBride included because it had been popular among fans despite not being released as a single. In the liner notes, McBride and producer Paul Worley include commentary on each song.

The four new songs "When God-Fearin' Women Get the Blues", "Blessed", "Where Would You Be" and "Concrete Angel" were all released as singles, with "Blessed" reaching number 1 on the Hot Country Songs charts and the other three all reaching top 10.

Track listing

Personnel
Personnel for tracks 15-19 only:

 Matt Chamberlain — drums on "When God-Fearing' Women Get the Blues", "Concrete Angel" and "Blessed"
 Joe Chemay — bass on "Where Would You Be"
 J. T. Corenflos — electric guitar on "Where Would You Be"
 David Davidson — violin on "Where Would You Be"
 Jerry Douglas — Dobro on "When God-Fearing' Women Get the Blues"
 Dan Dugmore — electric guitar on "Where Would You Be"
 Larry Franklin — fiddle on "When God-Fearing' Women Get the Blues"
 John Hobbs — piano and Hammond B-3 organ on "Where Would You Be"
 Dann Huff — electric guitar on "Where Would You Be"
 David Huff — programming on "Where Would You Be", "Concrete Angel" and "Blessed"
 Carolyn Dawn Johnson — background vocals on "Blessed"
 Troy Johnson — background vocals on "When God-Fearing' Women Get the Blues"
 Troy Lancaster — electric guitar on "Blessed"
 B. James Lowry — acoustic guitar on all tracks
 Steve Nathan — piano on "When God-Fearing' Women Get the Blues" and "Concrete Angel"; synthesizer on "Where Would You Be", "Concrete Angel"; Hammond B-3 organ on "Blessed"
 Martina McBride — lead vocals on all tracks; background vocals on "Blessed"
 Jerry McPherson — electric guitar on all tracks
 Pamela Sixfin — violin on "Where Would You Be"
 Dan Tyminski — background vocals on "When God-Fearing' Women Get the Blues"
 Biff Watson — acoustic guitar on "When God-Fearing' Women Get the Blues", "Concrete Angel" and "Blessed"
 Lonnie Wilson — drums on "Where Would You Be"
 Karen Winklemann — violin on "Where Would You Be"
 Glenn Worf — bass guitar on "When God-Fearing' Women Get the Blues", "Concrete Angel" and Blessed"
 Paul Worley — acoustic guitar on "Where Would You Be"
 Jonathan Yudkin — violin, viola and cello on "Where Would You Be" and "Blessed"

Chart performance

Weekly charts

Year-end charts

Singles

Certifications

References 

2001 greatest hits albums
Martina McBride albums
RCA Records compilation albums
Albums produced by Paul Worley